The 49th Annual Daytime Creative Arts Emmy Awards, were presented by the National Academy of Television Arts and Sciences (NATAS), honoring the best in U.S. daytime television programming in 2021. The winners were revealed on June 18, 2022, at the Pasadena Convention Center in Pasadena, California, while the nominations were announced alongside the main ceremony categories on May 5, 2022.

In December 2021, the Academy of Television Arts & Sciences (ATAS) and the National Academy of Television Arts and Sciences (NATAS) announced a major realignment of the Emmy Award ceremonies, among them was the creation of the Children's & Family Emmy Awards, rewarding children's programming and animation, hence, these categories will no longer be a part of the Daytime Creative Arts Award.

American home improvement media brand This Old House received the Lifetime Achievement Award.

Winners and nominees
The nominations for both the 49th Daytime Emmy Awards and the 49th Daytime Creative Arts & Lifestyle Emmy Awards were announced on May 5, 2022. Winners are listed first, highlighted in boldface, and indicated with a double dagger (‡).

Programming

Crafts

References

External links
 Daytime Emmys website

049 Creative Arts
2022 television awards
2022 in American television